Alfred Todd may refer to:

 Alfred Todd (politician) (1890–1970), British Member of Parliament
 Al Todd (Alfred Chester Todd, 1902–1985), American baseball catcher

See also